Preamble to the Constitution may refer to:

 Preamble to the United States Constitution
 Preamble to the Constitution of India
 Preamble to the Constitution Act, 1867
 Preamble and Title 1 of the Swiss Federal Constitution
 Preamble to the Constitution of Georgia (U.S. state)
 Preamble to the Albanian Constitution
 Preamble to the Constitution of the People's Socialist Republic of Albania
 Preamble to the 1997 Constitution of Fiji

See also
 Preamble